Workmen's Compensation (Occupational Diseases) Convention, 1925 is  an International Labour Organization Convention.

It was established in 1925:
Having decided upon the adoption of certain proposals with regard to workmen's compensation for occupational diseases,...

Modification 

This Convention was subsequently revised in 1934 by Convention C42 - Workmen's Compensation (Occupational Diseases) Convention (Revised), 1934, and again in 1964 by Convention C121 - Employment Injury Benefits Convention, 1964.

Ratifications
As of 2013, the convention had been ratified by 68 states. Of the ratifying states, eight had subsequently denounced the treaty.

External links 
Text.
Ratifications.

Occupational safety and health treaties
Workmen's
Treaties concluded in 1925
Treaties entered into force in 1927
Treaties of Algeria
Treaties of the People's Republic of Angola
Treaties of Argentina
Treaties of Armenia
Treaties of Australia
Treaties of the First Austrian Republic
Treaties of Bangladesh
Treaties of Belgium
Treaties of the Republic of Dahomey
Treaties of Bosnia and Herzegovina
Treaties of Burkina Faso
Treaties of the Kingdom of Bulgaria
Treaties of Burundi
Treaties of the Central African Republic
Treaties of Colombia
Treaties of the Comoros
Treaties of Croatia
Treaties of Cuba
Treaties of Czechoslovakia
Treaties of the Czech Republic
Treaties of Ivory Coast
Treaties of the Republic of the Congo
Treaties of Denmark
Treaties of Djibouti
Treaties of the United Arab Republic
Treaties of Finland
Treaties of the French Third Republic
Treaties of the Weimar Republic
Treaties of Guinea
Treaties of Guinea-Bissau
Treaties of British India
Treaties of the Kingdom of Iraq
Treaties of the Kingdom of Italy (1861–1946)
Treaties of the Empire of Japan
Treaties of Latvia
Treaties of Luxembourg
Treaties of Mali
Treaties of Mauritania
Treaties of Montenegro
Treaties of Morocco
Treaties of the People's Republic of Mozambique
Treaties of Myanmar
Treaties of Nicaragua
Treaties of Niger
Treaties of Norway
Treaties of the Dominion of Pakistan
Treaties of Papua New Guinea
Treaties of the Second Polish Republic
Treaties of the Ditadura Nacional
Treaties of São Tomé and Príncipe
Treaties of Serbia and Montenegro
Treaties of Yugoslavia
Treaties of Slovakia
Treaties of Slovenia
Treaties of the Second Spanish Republic
Treaties of Sri Lanka
Treaties of Switzerland
Treaties of North Macedonia
Treaties of Tunisia
Treaties of Zambia
Health treaties
Treaties extended to the Faroe Islands
1925 in labor relations